Phyllis Duganne, also known as Phyllis Duganne Given, was a writer in the United States. She wrote stores for newspapers, novels, poems, and plays. Some her works were adapted to film.

She had various paramours. She was the first wife of Austin Parker, a fighter pilot and journalist. She subsequently married Eben Given. She had a daughter. Duganne's sister performed internationally playing the violin.

Arnold Genthe photographed her ca. 1918. She was a niece of Wallace Irwin and Inez Haynes Irwin, who based one of her characters in her.

Writings
Nice Girl?
Ruthie
Prologue, her first novel
"Bedtime Story" (1936)
Poem "Another Year" by Mr. Love; Letter from Phyllis Duganne to Mr. Love (1944)
"White Man'll Get You"
"Nannie's Divorce"

Film adaptations
Sweet Sixteen (1928)
Nice Girl? (1941), based on her play
The Way Home (1957), original story

References

1976 deaths
1899 births
American women short story writers
American women dramatists and playwrights
20th-century American short story writers
American women poets
American women novelists
20th-century American dramatists and playwrights
20th-century American poets
20th-century American novelists
20th-century American women writers